Butler Chapel A.M.E. Zion Church may refer to:

Butler Chapel A.M.E. Zion Church (Greenville, Alabama)
Butler Chapel A.M.E. Zion Church (Tuskegee, Alabama)